Mohammad Gorjestani (born February 8, 1984) is an Iranian-American writer, director, and producer. He is best known for Exit 12, Sister Hearts and Refuge.

Life and career
Gorjestani was born in Tehran, Iran. His family fled to the United States in 1988 due to the Iran/Iraq War. He attended Cupertino High School and later attended the Vancouver Film School. His thesis film, The Shade, premiered at the Tribeca Film Festival in 2007 and was later acquired by the BBC.

Gorjestani received film grants from ITVS, for his near future short film Refuge, starring Nikohl Boosheri, and screened at the Tribeca Film Festival and SXSW Film Festival. He was named one of Filmmaker Magazine's 25 New Faces of Independent Film. His most recent short film, Exit 12, was acquired by Fox Searchlight Pictures.

Gorjestani has earned 9 Vimeo Staff Picks for his works. He created “The Happy Birthday Project”, a series of short films on Police killings in America. He is also a 2x recipient of the San Francisco Film Society's Kenneth Rainin Foundation (KRF) Filmmaking Grant for his feature film, currently in development. He is co-founder of Even/Odd.

Filmography

Awards and nominations

External links

References

Living people
Iranian film directors
1984 births